Mia Hagman (born August 18, 1979 in Helsinki, Finland) is a retired female breaststroke swimmer from Finland. Hagman competed for her native country at the 1996 Summer Olympics in Atlanta, Georgia. Her best result was a 14th place with the women's 4×100 m medley relay team at the 1996 Summer Olympics, alongside Minna Salmela, Anu Koivisto, and Marja Pärssinen.

References
Profile

1979 births
Living people
Finnish female breaststroke swimmers
Swimmers at the 1996 Summer Olympics
Olympic swimmers of Finland
Swimmers from Helsinki